The Polcevera (in Ligurian Pûçéivia or Ponçéivia) is a  river in Liguria (Italy).

Geography 
The river is named the Polcevera from Pontedecimo, at the confluence of the Torrente Riccò (left-hand) and torrente Verde (right-hand).

From Pontedecimo the Polcevera heads south, and at Bolzaneto it receives the waters of the Torrente Secca, another important left-hand tributary.

The  drainage basin of the Polcevera is totally included in the Province of Genova. Its highest point is Monte Taccone (1,113 m).

Main tributaries 
 Left hand:
 torrente Riccò,
 torrente Secca,
 torrente Geminiano (or Goresina), 
 torrente Torbella.
 Right hand:
 torrente Verde,
 torrente Burba,
 torrente Trasta,
 torrente Fegino (or Pianego).

History 
The Département du Polcevera or Dipartimento della Polcevera of Ligurian Republic took its name at the end of the 18th century from the stream.

Photo gallery

See also 

 Val Polcevera
 List of rivers of Italy

References

Rivers of Italy
Rivers of Liguria
Rivers of the Province of Genoa
Rivers of the Apennines
Drainage basins of the Ligurian Sea
Metropolitan City of Genoa